The women's long jump event at the 2005 European Athletics U23 Championships was held in Erfurt, Germany, at Steigerwaldstadion on 17 July.

Medalists

Results

Final
17 July

Participation
According to an unofficial count, 11 athletes from 9 countries participated in the event.

 (1)
 (1)
 (2)
 (1)
 (1)
 (1)
 (1)
 (2)
 (1)

References

Long jump
Long jump at the European Athletics U23 Championships